Victoria is a brand of fruit sodas produced by The Coca-Cola Company. It is available only in the state of Querétaro, Mexico and surrounding areas. Originally owned by the Grupo Fomento Queretano (FOQUE), a Coca-Cola bottling company in Querétaro, the Victoria brand was acquired by Coca-Cola in 2008.

Flavors 

 Apple
 Tamarind
 Currant
 Pineapple
 Lemon
 Mandarin
 Sangria
 Orange

References 

Coca-Cola brands
Mexican drinks